The  Journal of Symbolic Logic is a peer-reviewed mathematics journal published quarterly by Association for Symbolic Logic. It was established in 1936 and covers mathematical logic. The journal is indexed by Mathematical Reviews, Zentralblatt MATH, and Scopus. Its 2009 MCQ was 0.28, and its 2009 impact factor was 0.631.

External links

Mathematics journals
Publications established in 1936
Multilingual journals
Quarterly journals
Association for Symbolic Logic academic journals
Logic journals
Cambridge University Press academic journals